Church History: Studies in Christianity and Culture is a quarterly academic journal. It is published by the American Society of Church History and was established in 1932. It is abstracted and indexed in the ATLA Religion Database. The editors-in-chief are Andrea Sterk (University of Minnesota), Euan Cameron (Union Theological Seminary, Columbia University), Dana Robert (Boston University) and Jon Sensbach (University of Florida). The journal is regarded as highly authoritative in its field, and is compared to the British Journal of Ecclesiastical History.

References

External links 
 
 Back issue access

Academic journals published by learned and professional societies
Religion history journals
Publications established in 1932
Quarterly journals
Cambridge University Press academic journals